Shahrazad Ali (born April 27, 1954) is an American author of several books, including a paperback called The Blackman's Guide to Understanding the Blackwoman. The book was controversial bringing "forth community forums, pickets and heated arguments among Black people in many parts" of the United States when it was published in 1989.

Book reviews
Stories about the book appeared in the Los Angeles Times, The New York Times, The Washington Post, Newsday, and Newsweek. Ali appeared on Tony Brown's Journal, the Sally Jessy Raphaël Show, The Phil Donahue Show, Oprah Winfrey, and Geraldo TV programs—and was parodied on In Living Color. The book reportedly brought black bookstores new business, while other black bookstores banned it. It also provoked a book of essays (called Confusion by Any Other Name) that explored the negative impact of The Blackman's Guide.

A sample passage of her book, amongst others quoted in the media, describes African American women referred to as the "Blackwoman", using the parlance of the Nation of Islam stating:

Ali stated, "I wrote the book because black women in America have been protected and insulated against certain kinds of criticism and examination." Critics complained that book offered no factual data to substantiate her views or information about how she came to her conclusions and was essentially as a vanity-press product that would have been ignored by black people and others had it not been for the media attention its novelty and outrageousness created. Kimberlé Crenshaw has argued that Ali's views mirror a claim made by several commentators and public figures that many social problems in African-American communities are caused by "the breakdown of patriarchal family values", including William Raspberry, George Will, Daniel Patrick Moynihan in his report The Negro Family and Bill Moyers.

Guest commentator
In August 2013, Ali re-emerged in the media as a guest commentator on the HLN program Dr. Drew on Call. She was also interviewed on The Trisha Goddard Show along with white supremacist Craig Cobb, agreeing with Cobb that the black and white races should be separated.

Personal life
Ali is the mother of 12 children, nine of them adopted.

Selected bibliography
 How Not to Eat Pork (Or Life without the Pig), 1985
 The Blackman's Guide to Understanding the Blackwoman, 1989
 The Blackwoman's Guide to Understanding the Blackman, 1992
 Are You Still a Slave? 1994
 Day by Day, 1996
 How to Tell If Your Man Is Gay or Bisexual, 2003,

In addition she has written some books no longer in print.
 Urban Survival for the Year 2000 
 How to Prepare for the Y2K Computer Problem in the 'Hood

References

1954 births
Living people
African-American non-fiction writers
American non-fiction writers
African-American women writers
American religious writers
Female critics of feminism
Members of the Nation of Islam
Women religious writers
American women non-fiction writers
American reparationists
21st-century African-American people
21st-century African-American women
20th-century African-American people
20th-century African-American women